Brazilian Labour Party (Partido Trabalhista Brasileiro - PTB) may refer to:

 Brazilian Labour Party (historical), a centre-left party founded by supporters of Getúlio Vargas and dismantled after the 1964 military-led coup d'état
 Brazilian Labour Party (current), a centre-right party founded, in the period of redemocratization, the return to democratic rule after 1988